Frank Henry Read  (born 6 October 1934) is a British physicist. He is an Emeritus Professor of Physics at the University of Manchester.

Research 
Read is known for his experimental studies of electron collisions with atoms and molecules, for associated work in instrument design, and for theoretical work on the interpretation of the experimental results. He made advances in the study of threshold effects in electron collisions, and of post-collision interactions in the near-threshold excitation of resonance states.

His studies of the influence of molecular rotation and vibration on the angular distribution of scattered electrons enabled him to deduce the electronic configurations of short-lived molecular negative ion states. He also used the technique of delayed coincidences between electrons and photons for the precision measurements of lifetimes for atomic and molecular states.

Books 
 Electrostatic lenses (1976)
 Electromagnetic radiation (1980)

Awards and honours 
Read was elected a Fellow of the Royal Society (FRS) in 1984. In 2000, he was awarded the Holweck Prize for his work on atomic and molecular physics.

References 

Living people
British physicists
Fellows of the Royal Society
Fellows of the Institute of Physics
Alumni of the University of London
Alumni of the University of Manchester
Academics of the University of Manchester
1934 births